Uncle Scrooge and Donald Duck: The Don Rosa Library is a series of books published by Fantagraphics Books, collecting all of the Scrooge McDuck and Donald Duck comic book stories written and drawn by Don Rosa, originally published between 1987 and 2006. Following up Fantagraphics' Floyd Gottfredson Library and The Complete Carl Barks Disney Library, this series was launched in 2014, and completed with the tenth and last volume in late 2018.

Since 2017, Fantagraphics' The Don Rosa Library is being translated and published in Russia, Brazil, Poland and Italy by editors ACT, Editora Abril, Egmont and Panini Comics respectively. In June 2020, a translated edition for the German market was released, this one having minor editorial changes and adaptations compared to the Fantagraphics original library version and its previous translations.

Background

In September 2013, Fantagraphics Books announced that they were to publish a complete library of Don Rosa's Disney comics scheduled to launch during the summer of 2014. This would not be the first time that Fantagraphics published work by Don Rosa; in 1981 they published his Don Rosa's Comics & Stories in two volumes, featuring Pertwillaby Papers and later also his Tagdenah in The Comics Journal.

In the end of July 2014, the first volume of the Don Rosa Library, titled The Son of the Sun premiered at San Diego Comic-Con; it was also stated that the first volume would get a retailer release in September later the same year. However, it was finally released on October 4, 2014.

Format
The Don Rosa Library volumes are 8.5 × 11 inches (216 × 279 mm), making them a little bigger than the volumes of The Complete Carl Barks Disney Library measuring 7.5 × 10.25 inches (191 × 260 mm). The library consists of 10 volumes and represents a complete chronological collection of Rosa's Disney stories. The volumes were published in chronological order starting with Don Rosa's first Disney story: "The Son of the Sun" (1987), this volume was published in 2014.

The pages are mostly colored by Scott Rockwell, Erik Rosengarten, Rich Tommaso, Kneon Transitt, and Digikore Studios under the supervision of Disney expert David Gerstein and Gary Groth, with the artistic input of Rosa. Rosa has stated that he checks every page and panel offering valuable insight and assistance to the Fantagraphics team in restoring the stories as they were originally intended to be published.

The books are approximately 200 pages each containing about 160 pages of comics, with the remaining pages made up of supplementary material, which include comments on the stories by Rosa, story covers by the artist and a biography written by Rosa.

The volumes are sold separately with a suggested retail price of $30 each, but are also available in bundled sets by the pair in chronological order with a provided slipcase. The boxed sets had the suggested retail price at $50 and had therefore "a bargain price worthy of Scrooge McDuck himself!" according to the publisher. From 2014 to 2018, two volumes were published yearly. The boxed sets were introduced to the market in conjunction of the release of every evenly numbered volume.

Recognition 
2015 
Volume one of the series,  The Son of the Sun, is nominated for the Eisner Award in the category "Best Archival Collection/Project - Comic Books (at least 20 years old)".
 Volume one of the series is also nominated for the Harvey Award in the category "Best Domestic Reprint Project".
2016
Volume three and four of the series are nominated for the Eisner Award in the category "Best Archival Collection/Project - Comic Books".

Volumes and box sets

Volumes
{| class="wikitable sortable"
|+ style="background-color:#B0C4DE" | Volumes
|-
! style="background-color:#D0E4FE" data-sort-type="number" | Volume & date
! style="background-color:#D0E4FE" | Title
! style="background-color:#D0E4FE" | Period
| style="background-color:#D0E4FE" | Page count
! style="background-color:#D0E4FE" | ISBN
! style="background-color:#D0E4FE" | Inducks link
|-
|1:  2014-10-04||The Son of the Sun||1987–1988||208||||DRL 1
|-
|2:  2014-11-16||Return to Plain Awful||1988–1990||216||||DRL 2
|-
|3:  2015-09-06||Treasure Under Glass||1990–1992||196||||DRL 3
|-
|4:  2015-11-09||The Last of the Clan McDuck||1992–1995||196||||DRL 4
|-
|5:  2016-06-06||The Richest Duck in the World||1993–1994||196||||DRL 5
|-
|6:  2016-10-22||The Universal Solvent||1994–1997||212||||DRL 6
|-
|7:  2017-07-25||The Treasure of the Ten Avatars||1995–1998||192||||DRL 7
|-
|8:  2018-01-09||Escape From Forbidden Valley||1997–1999||208||||DRL 8
|-
|9:  2018-07-24||The Three Caballeros Ride Again!||1999–2002||224||||DRL 9
|-
|10:  2018-11-13||The Old Castle's Other Secret||2002–2006||224||||DRL 10
|}

Box sets

{| class="wikitable sortable"
|+ style="background-color:#B0C4DE" | Box sets
|-
! style="background-color:#D0E4FE" data-sort-type="number" | Volume & date
! style="background-color:#D0E4FE" | Title
! style="background-color:#D0E4FE" | Period
! style="background-color:#D0E4FE" | ISBN
|-
|1:  2014-11-30||The Don Rosa Library Vols. 1 & 2||1987–1990||
|-
|2:  2015-11-09||The Don Rosa Library Vols. 3 & 4||1990–1995||
|-
|3:  2016-10-25||The Don Rosa Library Vols. 5 & 6||1993–1995||
|-
|4:  2018-01-09||The Don Rosa Library Vols. 7 & 8||1996–1999||
|-
|5:  2018-11-13||The Don Rosa Library Vols. 9 & 10||1999–2006||

|}

Related 

Free Comic Book Day 2014

In December 2013 it was announced that Fantagraphics would participate in the Free Comic Book Day promotion campaign of May 2014 with a comic book issue showcasing the works of Don Rosa. The free issue was titled Uncle Scrooge and Donald Duck: A Matter of Some Gravity and  featured the two Rosa stories A Matter of Some Gravity and The Sign of the Triple Distelfink.

The Complete Life and Times of Scrooge McDuck

After all ten volumes of The Don Rosa Library had been released and the series therefore had been concluded, Fantagraphics released in 2019 the two-volume hardcover series The Complete Life and Times of Scrooge McDuck, an edition collecting The Life and Times of Scrooge McDuck and a few other stories which while not strictly being part of that series had a strong connection to them. The featured stories had been collected over several volumes of The Don Rosa Library (volumes 1 and 4–10) as that series was chronologically arranged.

Translated versions

Brazilian version
The Brazilian version is titled Tio Patinhas e Pato Donald - Biblioteca Don Rosa and was initially published by Editora Abril starting in September 2017 with each Brazilian volume corresponding to an American volume. The price of each Brazilian volume was R$79.90. In 2018, the publication was canceled just before the 6th volume, already announced, went into publication. 
In November 2019, Panini Brasil Ltda resumed the collection.

German version
A German version of the series published by the German Egmont Comic Collection began its publication in June 2020. Compared to previous translations of the Fantagraphics version of the series, this German edition has some layout changes such as the story articles appear just after each individual story compared to previously all of these have been collected in the end of each volume. The MSRP for a single volume is €30, while 2-volume box sets are priced at €70 .

Italian version
The Italian version is published by Panini Comics under the title The Don Rosa Library – Zio Paperone & Paperino. It started in November 2017 and will end in June 2019, for a total of 20 volumes, published monthly. Each American volume is divided into two Italian volumes, and the latter don't have titles. The prices of each Italian volume is €8.90.

Polish version
The polish version is published by Egmont Polska. It started in December 2019. The price of one  volume is PLN 69,99.

Russian version
The Russian version is published by ACT under the title Библиотека Дона Росы - Дядюшка Скрудж и Дональд Дак. It started in February 2017, with each Russian volume corresponding to an American volume. The price of each Russian volume is RUB 750.

Swedish version

Since September 2020 a Swedish translation of the work is published by Egmont Comics. A single volume is priced at 559 SEK.

See also

 The Complete Carl Barks Disney Library
 Walt Disney's Mickey Mouse (aka The Floyd Gottfredson Library)

Notes

References

External links
Fantagraphics - The Don Rosa Library
Preview - Uncle Scrooge & Donald Duck: The Son of the Sun
Preview - Uncle Scrooge & Donald Duck: Return to Plain Awful
Preview - Uncle Scrooge & Donald Duck: Treasure Under Glass
Preview - Uncle Scrooge & Donald Duck: Last of the Clan McDuck

Donald Duck comics by Don Rosa
Donald Duck
Fantagraphics titles
Comic book collection books
Disney comics titles